The Peter MacCallum Cancer Centre, also known as the Peter MacCallum Cancer Institute and commonly abbreviated as Peter Mac, is an Australian oncology research institute, cancer treatment and professional oncologist training centre located  in Melbourne, Victoria. The centre is named in honour of Sir Peter MacCallum.

The centre is Australia's first public hospital dedicated to cancer treatment, research and education.

Research programs at the centre include the Australian Cancer Research Foundation (ACRF) Cancer Cell Biology Program and the ACRF Victorian Centre for Functional Genomics in Cancer.

History
In 1949 the Victorian Cancer Institute was established and the following year its outpatient services were named the "Peter MacCallum Clinic". It was named after the (then) dean of the Faculty of Medicine at Melbourne University, Peter MacCallum who, with Rutherford Kaye-Scott, had a significant role in its founding. At the time it was a common practice not to inform patients that they had cancer. It was thought that because radiotherapy was also quite commonly used at that time to treat non-cancerous conditions such as severe acne, "strawberry birthmarks", frozen shoulders, keloid scars and also to provide a valuable and non-invasive means for medical sterilisation, the name "Peter MacCallum Clinic" was considered less threatening because the clinic could be positioned as a specialist radiotherapeutic centre rather than it being thought of as a dedicated cancer hospital.

The clinic was originally located in a single room of the Queen Victoria Hospital in central Melbourne. Its main facility was based at the corner William and Little Lonsdale streets, near Flagstaff Gardens where the County Court of Victoria buildings were later built. (The site was also at one time home to the Jessie McPherson Private Hospital.) The Institute established Australia's first training school for radiotherapists. In 1986, the institute (and the clinic) were collectively renamed as the "Peter MacCallum Cancer Institute". By 1994, the institute was operating out of 11 sites across Melbourne. At this time, it moved into St Andrew's Hospital in East Melbourne, having been purchased from the Uniting Church of Australia and Presbyterian Church of Victoria by the state government in 1990.

Location

In June 2016, the institute moved to the purpose-built building at the entrance to Melbourne's Parkville bio-medical precinct, located at 305 Grattan Street, Melbourne, with satellite services at the Bendigo Base Hospital, Epworth Eastern, the Monash Medical Centre (Moorabbin campus in East Bentleigh) and Sunshine Hospital in St Albans. It involves some shared services with the nearby Royal Melbourne Hospital, the Royal Women's Hospital and the Royal Children's Hospital. Its current site was previously home to the Royal Dental Hospital.

Notable staff
Wendy Harris
Sarah-Jane Dawson
Upulie Divisekera
Declan G. Murphy

See also

Health in Australia

References

External links
 

1949 establishments in Australia
Cancer hospitals
Cancer in Australia
Hospitals established in 1949
Hospitals in Melbourne
Medical research institutes in Melbourne